Ankothrips is a genus of thrip in the family Melanthripidae.

Species 
Catalogue of Life shows the following species as accepted within Ankothrips:

 Ankothrips aequalis Moulton, 1926
 † Ankothrips deploegi Nel et al., 2020
 Ankothrips diffractus Hood, 1924
 † Ankothrips dupeae Nel et al., 2020
 Ankothrips fissidens Trybom, 1910
 Ankothrips flavidus Pelikan, 1958
 Ankothrips gracilis Moulton, 1926
 Ankothrips mavromoustakisi Priesner, 1939
 Ankothrips niezabitowskii Schille, 1911
 Ankothrips notabilis Bailey, 1940
 Ankothrips robustus D.L.Crawford, 1909
 Ankothrips thuriferae Berzosa & Maroto, 1983
 Ankothrips vandykei Moulton, 1928
 Ankothrips yuccae Moulton, 1926
 Ankothrips zayandicus Minaei, Haftbaradaran & Mound, 2012

References 

Insects described in 1909
Thrips